The 2000–01 FC Metz season was the club's 69th season in existence and the 34th consecutive season in the top flight of French football. In addition to the domestic league, Metz will participate in this season's edition of the Coupe de France and Coupe de la Ligue. The season covers the period from 1 July 2000 to 30 June 2001.

Players

First-team squad
Source:

Pre-season and friendlies

Competitions

Overview

French Division 1

League table

Results summary

Result round by round

Matches

Coupe de France

Coupe de la Ligue

References

External links

FC Metz seasons
FC Metz